This list contains all current FCA Italy automobile assembly sites.  Including joint-ventures, license production and outsourced production.

Assembly sites

See also

 List of Chrysler factories
 List of Ford factories
 List of former automotive manufacturing plants
 List of Honda assembly plants
 List of Volkswagen Group factories

References

Lists of motor vehicle assembly plants